FutureFeed is a seaweed-based feed ingredient for livestock that is currently being developed by a team from Australia's Commonwealth Scientific and Industrial Research Organisation (CSIRO). The primary component of FutureFeed is dried Asparagopsis, a genus of red algae, which has been shown to reduce the methane (CH4) emissions of ruminant livestock by up to 99%. It is added to fodder at feedlots in dosages of 1-2% dietary intake to achieve this result. FutureFeed is currently being developed in collaboration with James Cook University (JCU) and Meat and Livestock Australia (MLA), with the primary goal of scaling for mainstream commercial use.

History 
Historical evidence suggests that farmers in Ancient Greece deliberately grazed cattle near beaches as a result of the productivity benefits it provided. This was also the case for Icelandic farmers in the 18th century.

In the early 2010s, Canadian dairy farmer, Joe Dorgan, noticed that cattle in paddocks adjacent to the beaches surrounding his property experienced higher levels of productivity than cattle positioned in paddocks further inland. This was observed through higher conception rates, longer periods of heat and increased milk production. It was discovered that the cattle had been eating dried kelp that had washed up on the shore.

In 2013, environmental scientists, Dr Rob Kinley and Professor Alan Freeden, were recruited by Dorgan to perform official testing on the nutritional data of kelp and to quantify the effects it had on cattle health. Dorgan intended to harvest and sell seaweed as an organic alternative to conventional supplements, however, further testing revealed its ability to reduce methane emissions of livestock. Kinley discovered that this form of kelp was capable of reducing methane production in cattle by up to 16%. Following this discovery, Kinley moved to Australia to partner with CSIRO and James Cook University (JCU) to conduct further testing. A research team at JCU, including Professor Rocky De Nys, had previously studied the effects of algal feed additives on livestock production systems as part of the Centre for Macroalgal Resources and Biotechnology (MACRO). This collaboration provided the foundations for FutureFeed as a commercial application of this research.

Research 
In 2013, Rocky De Nys and his team at JCU performed in vitro tests on 20 tropical macroalgae species using an artificial cow stomach. Dried seaweed biomass was mixed in with low quality roughage and combined with rumen fluid. Temperature and pH were then maintained to accurately simulate the fermentation process that occurs within ruminant stomachs during digestion. The total volume and concentrations of produced gases were measured for each sample at 12 hour intervals over a 72 hour period. All seaweed species were shown to reduce methane emissions in some capacity with a 50% average reduction, however this required dosages as much as 20% of dietary intake. This was problematic as the high concentrations required would most likely cause digestion issues for livestock by reducing the volume of volatile fatty acids. Asparagopsis taxiformis proved the most effective with a measured methane reduction of 98.9%. Dictyota was the second most effective seaweed with a measured methane reduction of 92%. The results of this experiment provided sufficient evidence for CSIRO to select Asparagopsis as the main ingredient of FutureFeed.

De Nys and Kinley expanded upon this experiment in 2015 with the goal of finding an ideal dosage of Asparagopsis. The aim was to maximise methane reduction without compromising enteric health. Varying concentrations of Asparagopsis taxiformis were mixed with low quality Rhodes grass and examined using standardised in vitro culture methods. Five dosages were tested ranging from 0.5% to 10% of dietary composition. The optimum concentration was determined to be 2%, as it virtually eliminated methane production and reduced the volume of total gases produced by 30% without affecting fermentation efficiency. Dosages under 5% had no effect on volatile fatty acid concentrations, which is the primary source of energy resulting from digestion.

In 2016, live tests were performed on sheep at the CSIRO Centre for Environment and Life Sciences in Floreat, Western Australia. 29 merino-cross wethers were fed one of five dosage levels (0%, 0.5%, 1%, 2% or 3% dietary intake) and monitored over a 72-day feeding period. In dosages of 2%, methane emission reductions of up to 85% were recorded when compared to control sheep. The sheep given dosages of 0.5% recorded at least a 50% reduction in methane emissions. No evidence of microbial adaptation occurred over the 72 days of testing as methane was continually and consistently mitigated. Tissue examination showed no adverse effects on the overall health of the sheep.

In 2017, live subject tests over 90 days were performed on cattle at the CSIRO Lansdown facility in Queensland. 28 Brahman-Angus steers were separated into four groups and given varying dosages of dried Asparagopsis in a simulated feedlot. Concentration levels for each group were 0% (control), 0.5% (low), 1% (medium) and 2% (high) dietary intake. Emissions monitoring was performed regularly using respiration chambers. Weekly weight checks were conducted to monitor cattle productivity. At the conclusion of the project, the cattle were terminated and had their carcasses sent to Meat Standards Australia (MSA) for meat quality assessment. Results are currently awaiting public release.

A panel of testers were unable to discern any difference in taste between control milk and milk produced by cattle with seaweed supplements added to their diet.

In 2020, FutureFeed won a Food Planet Prize worth $1million for an Asparagopsis product that reduces methane emissions in livestock.

FutureFeed was shortlisted for the 2021 Eureka Prize in the Applied Environmental Research category.

Production 

FutureFeed requires very little processing. Asparagopsis is harvested from a seaweed farm then freeze dried or low temperature dried to preserve as much bioactivity as possible. This can then be packaged and transported as required. FutureFeed consists of whole Asparagopsis, which is either one of two species: Asparagopsis taxiformis or Asparagopsis armata. Both species have very similar biochemistry and thus negligible difference in performance as an additive. The main distinction between either species is the conditions that each flourishes in. Asparagopsis taxiformis thrives in tropical and subtropical climates and can be found in Australian coastal waters, predominantly in northern Queensland and Western Australia. Asparagopsis armata thrives in temperate climates and is found naturally in the Mediterranean Sea and Tasman Sea. The species of Asparagopsis used in FutureFeed will depend on the location and climate of the seaweed farm that FutureFeed will be sourced from. As a global supply chain is planned for distributing FutureFeed, the specific Asparagopsis species used may vary at different locations all over the world.

Effect on livestock 

FutureFeed is incorporated into the diet of livestock at a feedlot, usually as flakes, pellets or a ground powder. Homogeneity of seaweed biomass within the feed must be maintained to ensure uniform intake for consistent effect. The primary chemical in Asparagopsis inhibits methane production in livestock by interacting with the compounds produced during digestion. This chemical is classified as bromoform (CHBr3) and is naturally occurring in red algae species. Bromoform disrupts the chemical reaction between enzymes and vitamin B12, which is a key contributor to the production of methane in ruminant stomachs. Using between 1% and 2% of dietary intake, FutureFeed is able to reduce methane production in livestock by at least 80%.

Research into livestock methane production has shown that up to 12% of energy that fodder produces during digestion is lost as methane gas emissions, primarily from belching. It is a common misconception that the majority of methane emissions from livestock is through flatulent gas. Flatulent gas contributes to less than 10% of methane emissions as opposed to belching which contributes up to 95%. This is caused by bacteria living within the first stomach, known as the rumen, which serves as a 'fermentation tank' to effectively break down nutrients during digestion. Methane production represents an inefficiency of energy conversion that would otherwise contribute to the productive metabolism of livestock, such as milk, muscle or wool production. By impeding methane production, FutureFeed increases the efficiency of ruminant digestion in livestock to improve productivity.

Productivity improvements are directly related to the quality of feed that is ingested. Grain-based feeds such as corn and barley produce up to one third less methane gas in cattle than grass fed cattle. Grass is generally more fibrous and energy intensive for ruminant stomachs to digest, especially lower quality roughage. As a result, larger volumes of methane gas are produced as waste when livestock are given low quality fodder. Therefore, FutureFeed is more likely to provide greater productivity benefits to livestock that are given lower quality feed than those given higher quality feed.

Team 

The development team behind FutureFeed represents a partnership between CSIRO, James Cook University and Meat & Livestock Australia (MLA). All testing and research is performed as part of the National Livestock Methane Program (NLMP), a research effort coordinated by MLA in partnership with 16 major research organisations and funded by the Australian Department of Agriculture. The main goal of the NLMP is to research methods of reducing methane emissions and increasing productivity, specifically for livestock. CSIRO, MLA and JCU, the IP Partners, hold patents for the use of Asparagopsis for methane reduction. The IP partners have licensed FutureFeed the global rights, exclusively to the patents.

The primary team members are as follows 

 Andrew Gatenby - CEO
 Dr Rob Kinley - Chief Scientist 
 Rob Hewitt - CFO 
 Joanne Barber - Commercial Director 
 Eve Faulkner - Marketing and Communications Manager

Challenges 
The biggest challenge facing FutureFeed at present is the development of a supply chain for seaweed. As the major component of FutureFeed is Asparagopsis, its scalability is directly correlated to the volume of seaweed that can be produced. There is potential to import large amounts of seaweed from South-East Asia where infrastructure for seaweed farms is already established, however Asparagopsis is not commercially farmed at these locations. The cost of wild-harvest Asparagopsis is approximately AUD $200/kg, which is not viable for commercial use. The target price is aimed to be competitive with other imported algae, at less than AUD $5/kg, by developing infrastructure for mass production. Despite the small amounts required for FutureFeed to be effective, it is estimated that feeding 10% of Australia’s cattle will require 300,000 tonnes of seaweed to be produced each year, demanding over 6,000 hectares of seaweed farms. In order to become a commercial product, significant additional funding is required for the development of cultivation infrastructure and techniques to mass produce Asparagopsis.

The use of FutureFeed is currently only effective for feedlots due to its sole application as a feed additive. Grass fed livestock through grazing are unable to use FutureFeed as feed additives cannot be easily applied to their diet. The digestion of grass-based roughage in livestock emits more methane than grain-based feed, therefore FutureFeed would potentially be more effective for grass fed livestock. As a result, additional methods are currently being developed to allow incorporation of FutureFeed into all styles of livestock feeding.

Similar projects 
The specific use of Asparagopsis as a feed additive to reduce livestock methane emissions is a patented application held by CSIRO. However, there are numerous other projects and teams using similar research to develop their own versions of seaweed-based livestock supplements and methods of seaweed production. 

 North Atlantic Organics (NAO) is a Canadian company started by Joe Dorgan in 2011, which sells dried Laminariaceae (Kelp) and Rockweed, labelled as Atlantic-Gro. Atlantic-Gro is sold as an organic alternative to conventional livestock supplements. It is harvested from the shores of Prince Edward Island, Canada.
 Symbrosia is a start-up originating from Yale University that is developing a low-cost, sustainable method for producing Asparagopsis taxiformis and regenerating local shrimp population as a by-product.
 Greener Grazing is a project underway by global seafood producer Australis Aquaculture, which is developing infrastructure and methods to commercially farm Asparagopsis taxiformis. Research and testing is currently being performed at facilities in Vietnam and Portugal.
Elm Innovations is a social venture founded by Stanford graduate, Joan Salwen. The company seeks to connect investors with seaweed research efforts in collaboration with livestock industry partners.
A research project at University of California, Davis is underway to study the effects of seaweed consumption on cattle. As part of an experiment in 2018, Holstein dairy cows were given seaweed supplements and achieved methane reduction levels of 58%. The project is led by animal science professor, Ermias Kebreab.

See also
3-Nitrooxypropanol

References 

Animal feed
Cattle